Leo F. Prendergast (August 25, 1902 – September 1967) was an American football player and coach of football and basketball.  He served as the head football coach at Lehigh University from 1943 to 1945, compiling a record of 3–15–1. Prendergast was the 20th football head coach for the Lehigh Mountain Hawks. Prendergast was also the head basketball coach at Lehigh from 1943 to 1946, tallying a mark of 9–41.  He attended Lafayette College, where he played football as a lineman under Jock Sutherland, and from which he graduated in 1924.
Prendergast had previously been the head football coach at Bethlehem High School (1927–1937), and after World War II was the line coach for the Bethlehem Bulldogs semi-professional football team.

Head coaching record

College football

References

1902 births
1967 deaths
Lafayette Leopards football players
Lehigh Mountain Hawks football coaches
Lehigh Mountain Hawks men's basketball coaches
High school football coaches in Pennsylvania